El Harrach Gare is a transfer station serving the Line 1 of the Algiers Metro. It did not open on 4 July 2015 with the rest of the Line 1 extension, and will open in the future.

References

External links
 Algiers Metro Site
 Ligne 1 Algiers Metro on Structurae

Algiers Metro stations
Railway stations opened in 2015
2015 establishments in Algeria
Railway stations in Algeria opened in the 21st century